Saragossa siccanorum is a species of moth of the family Noctuidae. It is found in south-eastern Europe, Turkey, Lebanon, Israel, Iraq, Azerbaijan, Ukraine, southern Russia, central Asia, western Mongolia and north-western China.

Adults are on wing from October to January. There is one generation per year.

Subspecies
Saragossa siccanorum siccanorum
Saragossa siccanorum poecilographa

External links
 Hadeninae of Israel

Hadeninae
Moths of Europe
Moths of Asia
Moths of the Middle East